The Bull Run Formation is a Late Triassic (Norian) stratigraphic unit in the eastern United States. Fossil fish bones and scales have been found in outcrops of the formation's Groveton Member in Manassas National Battlefield Park. Indeterminate fossil ornithischian tracks have been reported from the formation.

The Bull Run Formation was once considered part of the Culpeper Group of the Newark Supergroup, but the United States Geological Survey no longer formally recognizes this formation (it is abandoned).

Fossil content 
The following fossils were reported from the formation:
 Rutiodon cf. manhattanensis

Ichnofossils
 Agrestipus hottoni
 Eubrontes cursorius
 Kayentapus minor
 Grallator (Eubrontes)
 Anomoepus sp.
 Diplurus sp.

See also 
 List of dinosaur-bearing rock formations
 List of stratigraphic units with ornithischian tracks
 Indeterminate ornithischian tracks

References

Bibliography 
 Hunt, ReBecca K., Vincent L. Santucci and Jason Kenworthy. 2006. "A preliminary inventory of fossil fish from National Park Service units." in S.G. Lucas, J.A. Spielmann, P.M. Hester, J.P. Kenworthy, and V.L. Santucci (ed.s), Fossils from Federal Lands. New Mexico Museum of Natural History and Science Bulletin 34, pp. 63–69
 R. E. Weems. 2006. The manus print of Kayentapus minor: its bearing on the biomechanics and ichnotaxonomy of early Mesozoic saurischian dinosaurs. In J. D. Harris, S. G. Lucas, J. A. Spielmann, M. G. Lockley, A. R. C. Milner, & J. I. Kirkland (eds.), The Triassic-Jurassic Terrestrial Transition. New Mexico Museum of Natural History and Science Bulletin 37:369-378
  
 R. E. Weems and P. G. Kimmel. 1993. Upper Triassic reptile footprints and a coelacanth fish scale from the Culpeper Basin, Virginia. Proceedings of the Biological Society of Washington 16(2):390-401
 J. R. Smith. 1982. Dinosaurs in Virginia—evidence of two new genera. Lapidary Journal 36(6):1110-1111
 R. Weems. 1979. A large parasuchian (phytosaur) from the Upper Triassic portion of the Culpeper Basin of Virginia (USA). Proceedings from the Biological Society of Washington 92(4):682-688

Geologic formations of Maryland
Geologic formations of Virginia
Triassic System of North America
Triassic geology of Virginia
Norian Stage
Mudstone formations
Shale formations
Siltstone formations
Lacustrine deposits
Ichnofossiliferous formations
Paleontology in Virginia